The 2021 Miami mayoral election was held on November 2, 2021, to elect the mayor of Miami, Florida. The election was officially nonpartisan. If no candidate received a majority of the vote in the first ballot, the top two candidates would have advanced to a runoff election on November 16, 2021.

Incumbent Republican mayor Francis X. Suarez was re-elected, receiving over 78% of the vote in the first ballot, thus avoiding the run-off. He was first elected in 2017, receiving 86% of the vote in the first ballot.

Candidates

Declared 

 Anthony Melvin Dutrow, union organizer and Socialist Workers Party nominee for Utah's 3rd congressional district in 1990 (Socialist Workers)
 Marie Frantz Exantus, businesswoman (Democratic)
 Max Martinez, businessman (Democratic)
 Frank Pichel, private investigator for Joe Carollo (Democratic)
 Francis X. Suarez, incumbent mayor (Republican)

Disqualified 

 Mayra Joli, attorney and independent candidate for Florida's 27th congressional district in 2018 (Republican)

Declined 

 Tomás Regalado, former mayor of Miami (Republican)

Primary election

Results

References

External links
Official campaign websites
 Marie Frantz Exantus (D) for Mayor
 Maxwell Manuel Martinez (D) for Mayor
 Francis Suarez (R) for Mayor 

Mayoral election, 2021
Miami
2021
Miami
Miami